The 1982 United States Senate election in Maine took place on November 2, 1982. Edmund Muskie, elected in the 1976 Senate election, resigned his seat in 1980 to become Secretary of State. Appointed incumbent Democratic senator George J. Mitchell won election to a full six-year term.

Democratic primary

Candidates
George J. Mitchell, incumbent U.S. Senator

Results

Republican primary

Candidates
David F. Emery, U.S. Representative from the 1st congressional district

Results

General election

Candidates
George J. Mitchell (D), incumbent U.S. Senator
David F. Emery (R), U.S. Representative from the 1st congressional district

Results

See also
 1982 United States Senate elections

References

1982
Maine
United States Senate